Presidential elections were held in Taiwan on 23 March 1996. It was the first direct presidential election in Taiwan, officially the Republic of China. In the previous eight elections the president and vice president had been chosen in a ballot of the deputies of the National Assembly, in accordance with the 1947 constitution. These were the first free and direct elections in the History of Taiwan.

The outcome of the 1996 election was that Lee Teng-hui was elected as President and Lien Chan as Vice President. Lee stood as the incumbent, and as the candidate of the ruling Kuomintang. He won a majority of 54% of the votes cast. His election followed missile tests by the People's Republic of China (PRC). These were an attempt to intimidate the Taiwanese electorate and discourage them from supporting Lee, however the tactic backfired. Voter turnout was 76.0%.

Candidates
The ruling Kuomintang nominated president Lee Teng-hui in August 1995 at its 14th Party Congress after plans to institute a closed primary system by his opponents were thwarted. As his running mate, Lee chose Lien Chan, who had attempted to resign his position as Premier of the Republic of China to join Lee's ticket. Lee did not accept Lien's resignation, as Lien's potential successors to the premiership stood little chance of legislative confirmation. After the election, the Judicial Yuan allowed Lien to keep both posts.

The opposition Democratic Progressive Party conducted an extensive nomination process: the presidential candidate was selected after two rounds of voting and fifty public debates by the two finalists. Hsu Hsin-liang, Lin Yi-hsiung, You Ching, and Peng Ming-min contended for this position. The seventy-two-year-old Peng emerged victorious and nominated legislator Frank Hsieh to be his running mate. Peng opposed trade with mainland China unless the PRC promised to "treat Taiwan as an equal." Though he argued that the One-China policy would lead to another February 28 Incident, he took the position that Taiwan was already de facto independent so a formal declaration of Taiwan independence was unnecessary unless the PRC attacked. However, Peng rejected unification with the mainland outright, describing the notion as "suicide" and "self-destruction."

Former Taiwan Provincial Governor Lin Yang-kang ran as an independent with former Premier Hau Pei-tsun as his running mate. After the pair registered as candidates, they were endorsed by New Party. Both Lin and Hau were expelled from the Kuomintang on 13 December 1995. They supported the One-China principle and favored opening direct links with the mainland. They argued that the KMT, led by Lee, had abandoned all attempts at unification.

A second independent ticket consisted of former Control Yuan President Chen Li-an for President and Control Yuan member Wang Ching-feng for Vice President. Chen Li-an, the son of former Premier and Vice President Chen Cheng, used his Buddhist background (lay leader of the Fo Guang Shan order) and stressed moral purity and honest government. He walked for eighteen days wearing a farmer's straw hat to spread his views.

Former Taipei mayor Kao Yu-shu declared an end to his candidacy in January 1996. Feminist writer Shih Chi-ching also bid for the presidency, selecting Wu Yue-chen as her vice president. However, Shih and Wu's campaign ended after the Judicial Yuan ruled against them, finding that the ticket failed to meet the endorsement quota. Mudslinging was rampant between the remaining four presidential tickets. The KMT claimed that the Taiwanese mafia had amputated Peng's arm to recoup gambling debts. However, Peng had lost his arm in an American air raid on Nagasaki during World War II. Independent candidate Lin Yang-kang alleged that Lee Teng-hui had been a Chinese Communist Party member, which he denied at the time, but later admitted involvement in a 2002 interview. The Kuomintang's website was also subject to cyberattacks. Chen Li-an criticized every other candidate for their advanced age.

1996 Taiwan Strait Crisis

From March 8 to March 15, the People's Liberation Army sent ballistic missiles  within  (just inside the ROC's territorial waters) off the ports of Keelung and Kaohsiung. This action was intended to intimidate the Taiwanese electorate into voting against Lee and Peng, which Beijing branded "absolutely identical in attempting to divide the motherland." Similarly, Chen Li-an warned, "If you vote for Lee Teng-hui, you are choosing war." The crisis came to an end when two U.S. aircraft carrier battle groups were positioned near Taiwan.

Lee, who told his people to resist "state terrorism," was seen as a strong leader who could negotiate with the PRC. Because of this, many constituents from southern Taiwan who favored independence voted for him. One Taipei newspaper, United Daily News reported that up to 14 to 15 percent of Lee's 54% vote share came from DPP supporters.

Results

Maps

Blue: Lee-Lien ticket; Yellow: Lin-Hau ticket

Notes

References

President
Taiwan
Presidential elections in Taiwan
March 1996 events in Asia